Welsh's Crossing Halt was a railway station located south of Thrumster, Highland between Wick and Lybster.

History 
The station was opened as part of the Wick and Lybster Railway. As with the other stations on the line, the station was closed from 3 April 1944.

References

Notes

Sources 
 
 
 

Disused railway stations in Caithness
Railway stations in Great Britain opened in 1936
Railway stations in Great Britain closed in 1944
Former London, Midland and Scottish Railway stations